Irgizly (Irğıźlı) is a rural locality (a village) and the administrative centre of Irgizlinsky Selsoviet, Burzyansky District, Bashkortostan, Russia. The population was 366 as of 2010. There are 9 streets.

Geography 
Irgizly is located 51 km northwest of Starosubkhangulovo (the district's administrative centre) by road. Kutanovo is the nearest rural locality.

References 

Rural localities in Burzyansky District